Tibial condyle can refer to:

 Medial condyle of tibia
 Lateral condyle of tibia